Gnathamitermes is a genus of termites in the family Termitidae. There are about six described species in Gnathamitermes.

Species
These six species belong to the genus Gnathamitermes:
 Gnathamitermes grandis (Light, 1930)
 Gnathamitermes magnoculus Light, 1932
 Gnathamitermes nigriceps (Light, 1930)
 Gnathamitermes perplexus (Banks in Banks & Snyder, 1920) (long-jawed desert termites)
 Gnathamitermes rousei Pierce, 1958
 Gnathamitermes tubiformans (Buckley, 1862)

References

Further reading

 

Termites
Articles created by Qbugbot
Termite genera